The 20/20 Project was a Canadian hip hop trio from Toronto, Ontario, formed in 2010. The group consisted of D-Squared (Emcee), Idrees (Emcee and sometimes credited as Drees or Bigg Drees) and producer The Unknown DJ, aka DJ Unknown. Their style is old school hip hop; their songs, which are mainly produced and mixed by DJ Unknown, focus on wordplay and storytelling.

Their debut EP, Employees of the Year received generally positive reviews, and consistently charted in the top 10 on a number of Campus Radio Stations across Canada.  It peaked #1 on Ottawa's CHUO 89.1 hip hop charts the week ending November 16, 2010.

In 2015, The 20/20 Project released the album Tapes and Crates. The band has been inactive since.

Discography

EPs
 Employees of the Year EP (2010), Independent
 Tapes and Crates (2015)

References

Musical groups established in 2010
Musical groups from Toronto
Canadian hip hop groups
2010 establishments in Ontario